Drozd is a Slavic surname.  Czech feminine form is Drozdová. The word means "thrush" in Belarusian, Czech, Polish, Russian, Serbo-Croatian, and Ukrainian. The surname  may refer to:

Grigory Drozd (born 1979), Russian professional boxer
Jarosław Drozd, Polish politologist and diplomat
Pavel Drozd (born 1995), Russian ice dancer
Peter Drozd (born 1973), Czech football player
Sergei Drozd (born 1990), Belarusian professional ice hockey player
Steven Drozd (born 1969), American musician
Valentin Drozd (1906–1943), Soviet admiral
Yuriy Drozd (born 1944), Ukrainian mathematician

See also
Drozda surname
 
Drozdov (surname)

Polish-language surnames
Belarusian-language surnames
Ukrainian-language surnames
Russian-language surnames
Czech-language surnames